Mark Wood (born 27 June 1972) is an English former professional footballer who played as a winger or as a midfielder in the Football League for York City and in non-League football for Pickering Town and Goole Town.

References

1972 births
Living people
Sportspeople from Scarborough, North Yorkshire
English footballers
Association football wingers
York City F.C. players
Pickering Town F.C. players
Goole Town F.C. players
English Football League players
Footballers from North Yorkshire